"Body Feels Exit" (stylized as Body Feels EXIT) is Namie Amuro's debut solo single on the Avex Trax label. Released nine days after her only album with former label, Toshiba-EMI, "Body Feels Exit" debuted in the top three on the Oricon chart and would be her first of 24 consecutive top ten solo singles.

Information 
"Body Feels Exit" can be considered as her third single because she featured exclusively on "Stop the Music" and "Taiyou no Season," her two previous singles with the Super Monkey's. It also marks the beginning of the collaboration between Namie and Tetsuya Komuro. The song can be described as an upbeat dance track. "Body Feels Exit" was a huge hit at the time and still today is one of the singer's most popular songs and a fan favorite.  The original version of the song did not appear on her first studio album, Sweet 19 Blues, but featured on her first greatest hits compilation 181920. The single was certified platinum by the RIAJ for 400,000 copies shipped to stores.

Taito ad campaign 
The song was used as background music in 8 commercials for TAITO to promote the X-55 model. Amuro appeared in all ad campaigns.

Track listing

Other versions 
An English language version of "Body Feels Exit" was recorded by Eurobeat artist, Virginelle. It appears on the album, Super Eurobeat Vol. 80: Request Countdown 80 (1997), as part of a bonus disc of covers originally written by Tetsuya Komuro. Also performed by Anza Ohyama at a Sailor Moon Event in 1996.

Personnel 
 Namie Amuro – vocals, background vocals
 Tetsuya Komuro – background vocals, composing, arrangement

Production 
 Producer – Tetsuya Komuro
 Mixing - Dave Ford (Track 1, 2 & 4)
 Remix - FKB (Track 3)

Charts 
Oricon Sales Chart (Japan)

Oricon Sales Chart (Japan)

Oricon Sales Chart (Japan)

References

External links 
 Watch the "Body Feels EXIT" music video at Dailymotion

1995 singles
Namie Amuro songs
Songs written by Tetsuya Komuro
1995 songs
Avex Trax singles